The Lexington Counter Clocks are an American professional baseball team based in Lexington, Kentucky. They are a member of the South Division of the Atlantic League of Professional Baseball, a "partner league" of Major League Baseball. The Counter Clocks have played their home games at Wild Health Field since 2001.

History
The Class-A Kissimmee Cobras moved from the Florida State League to Lexington following the 2000 season. The 2001 season began under manager J. J. Cannon. The team finished their first regular season with record of 92 wins and 48 losses and in first place of the sixteen-team South Atlantic League. In the postseason, the Legends defeated the Hagerstown Suns in the first round and advanced to play the Asheville Tourists in the League Championship Series. However, the series was cancelled after the Legends won the first two games of the series due to the September 11 attacks and the Legends were declared co-champions after having gone up 2-0 before game three was cancelled.

Cannon returned to manage in 2002 and led the team to another winning record, but the Legends failed to qualify for the playoffs. Lexington made a return trip to the playoffs in 2003, but were defeated by the Lake County Captains in the first round. In 2004, the Legends finished with a record of 68–72, their first losing record in team history. The following season, the Legends posted an 81-58 regular season record and finished in first-place under manager Tim Bogar.

Roger Clemens
On May 31, 2006, Roger Clemens announced that he would come out of retirement to pitch for the Houston Astros for the remainder of the 2006 season. Planning to keep himself to a strict 60-pitch limit, Clemens returned to baseball with the Legends, where his oldest son Koby played. Father and son denied reports that Koby would catch his dad for the return. "He doesn't listen to me", Roger Clemens said. "We'd be shaking each other off and arguing too much." In his first game, Clemens threw 62 pitches, allowed no walks, and only 1 run while striking out 6 batters in three innings of work with the Legends, who won the game 5–1.

Joe Mikulik incident
The team received national attention again in 2006 following a controversial game against the Asheville Tourists on June 25. In the fifth inning of the game, Tourists manager Joe Mikulik went on an extended tirade after being ejected from the game following an argument with an umpire. The event received coverage on various television programs, including NBC's The Tonight Show, ESPN's Pardon the Interruption and SportsCenter, and MSNBC's Countdown with Keith Olbermann. Roger Clemens' appearance as a Legend as well as Joe Mikulik's meltdown are chronicled in the 2011 documentary film Legendary: When Baseball Came to the Bluegrass.

2021 and beyond
The Lexington Legends were one of the minor league teams that lost MLB affiliation under a new plan by the MLB. On February 18, 2021, the team announced that it would be joining the Atlantic League of Professional Baseball, an independent MLB Partner league, for the 2021 season.

On October 28, 2022, the team and Wild Health Field were sold to Nathan and Keri Lyons.

2023 name change
It was announced March 6, 2023 that the team was changing its name to the Lexington Counter Clocks.

Mascots
The Legends' mascot was Big L, a mustachioed baseball player caricature. His best friend was Pee Wee, another team mascot.

Along with its new name, in 2023 the Lexington Counter Clocks introduced two new mascots: Hoss, a horse that races to the left, and Dinger, a clock swinging a bat.

Season by season results
Since their inception, the Lexington franchise has played 21 seasons, originally in the South Atlantic League (2001 - 2019) and later the Atlantic League of Professional Baseball (2021 - Present). As of the completion of the 2022 season, the club has played in 2,886 regular season games and compiled a record of 1,400 - 1,486 or a .485 winning percentage. The team has a postseason record of 19-8.

Notes
 This column indicates overall wins and losses during the regular season and excludes any postseason play.
 This column indicates overall position in the league standings.
 This column indicates overall position in the divisional standings[split seasons for 2013 and 2014].
 Determined by finding the difference in wins plus the difference in losses divided by two, this column indicates "games behind" the team that finished in overall first place in the division [split seasons for 2013 and 2014].
 This column indicates wins and losses during the postseason.
 Due to the September 11 attacks, the 2001 best-of-five League Championship Series against Asheville was cancelled. Asheville and Lexington were declared SAL Co-Champions.

Roster

Counter Clocks Hall of Fame
The Counter Clocks have honored ten past members of the organization by inducting them in the Counter Clocks Hall of Fame. These individuals are:

 Josh Anderson, outfielder (2004), inducted in 2005
 John Buck, catcher (2001), inducted in 2005
 Joe Cannon, manager (2001–2002), inducted in 2006
 Félix Escalona, second baseman (2001), inducted in 2005
 Mike Gallo, pitcher (2002), inducted in 2007
 Kirk Saarloos, pitcher (2001), inducted in 2006
 Dave Coggin, pitcher (2005), inducted in 2008
 Alan Stein, Team President/COO, inducted in 2005
 Charley Taylor, pitching coach, inducted in 2005
 Jon Topolski, outfielder (2001), inducted in 2005
 Tommy Whiteman, shortstop (2001–2002), inducted in 2007

References
General

 "Lexington, Kentucky Minor League History." Baseball-Reference. Retrieved on September 11, 2010.
 "Lexington History (SAL)." The Baseball Cube. Retrieved on September 11, 2010.

Specific

External links
Official website

Atlantic League of Professional Baseball teams
Defunct South Atlantic League teams
Houston Astros minor league affiliates
Kansas City Royals minor league affiliates
Baseball teams established in 2001
Professional baseball teams in Kentucky
Legends
2001 establishments in Kentucky